Gabriella Kindl (born 19 January 1964) is a Hungarian swimmer. She competed in two events at the 1980 Summer Olympics.

References

1964 births
Living people
Hungarian female swimmers
Olympic swimmers of Hungary
Swimmers at the 1980 Summer Olympics
Swimmers from Budapest
20th-century Hungarian women
21st-century Hungarian women